Streptoalloteichus is a genus of bacteria within the family Pseudonocardiaceae that contains two known species:
 S. hindustanus, which is known for the production of tallysomycin, an antitumor antibiotic;
 S. tenebrarius, which is known for production of tobramycin, and which was previously classified as Streptomyces tenebrarius.

References

External links
Streptoalloteichus J.P. Euzéby: List of Prokaryotic names with Standing in Nomenclature

Pseudonocardiales
Bacteria genera